"Sexy Eyes" is a song written by Annerley Gordon, Alfredo Larry Pignagnoli, Davide Riva and Paul Sears and performed by Danish singer Whigfield. It was released in March 1996 as the seventh and final single from her first album, Whigfield. It became Whigfield's first top-10 hit in Australia, becoming the 19th-highest-selling single for 1997.

Chart performance
"Sexy Eyes" went on to become a major hit on the charts in both Australia and Europe. In Europe, the single managed to climb into the top 10 in Austria and Spain. In Austria, it was Whigfield's second top-10 hit. Additionally, it was a top-20 hit in Denmark, Germany and Switzerland, as well as on the Eurochart Hot 100, where it reached number 17. In the United Kingdom, the "Sexy Eyes" remixes reached number 68 on the UK Singles Chart and number 37 on the Scottish Singles Chart in 1998. Outside Europe, the song was very successful in Australia, peaking at number 6, becoming the 19th highest-selling single for 1997 there. It also earned a platinum record there, with a sale of 70,000 singles.

Music video
The music video for "Sexy Eyes" was directed by Italian director Giacomo De Simone. It features Whigfield in Porto Venere, Italy. It begins with the singer arriving town, driving in her car. This time she has curls in her hair and wears black sunglasses. After beginning to sing, she leaves her car and brings a silver hard case with her. Then she dances on her way along the pier of the city. She stops by a gypsy woman, who is selling porcelain cats. Whigfield takes a look, but refuses to buy when the woman offers her one. The singer continues dancing through the narrow alleys of Porto Venere. Suddenly three white sailors appear. They are chasing Whigfield and dance with her along on her way. A scene shows her kissing one of them. Towards the end, the sailors disappear, one by one. Back in her car, she opens her hard case, and there lies three white porcelain cats. The video ends as Whigfield drives away in her car, now with the sailors.

Track listing

Netherlands CD-maxi - Danza
"Sexy Eyes" (David's epic edit - single version)
"Sexy Eyes" (MBRG edit)
"Sexy Eyes" (album version)
"Sexy Eyes" (extended album version)
"Sexy Eyes" (David's epic experience)
"Sexy Eyes" (original MBRG)

Mexico CD-Maxi - Musart
"Sexy Eyes" (David's epic edit)
"Sexy Eyes" (MBRG edit)
"Sexy Eyes" (album version)
"Sexy Eyes" (David's epic experience)
"Sexy Eyes" (original MBRG)
"Out of Sight"

Germany CD-Maxi - ZYX Music/Australia CD-Maxi - Transistor Music
"Sexy Eyes" (David's epic edit)
"Sexy Eyes" (MBRG edit)
"Sexy Eyes" (album version)
"Sexy Eyes" (David's epic experience)
"Sexy Eyes" (original MBRG)
"Out of Sight"
"Junto a Ti (Close to You)"

Germany: CD-Maxi - ZYX Music: Remixes
"Sexy Eyes" (original MBRG radio edit)
"Sexy Eyes" (Amen remix)
"Sexy Eyes" (Davids epic experience mix)

Australian EP
"Sexy Eyes" (Single Version)
"Sexy Eyes" (Mbrg Edit)
"Sexy Eyes"
"Sexy Eyes" (Extended Version)
"Sexy Eyes" (David's Epic Experience)
"Sexy Eyes" (Original Mbrg)
"Sexy Eyes" (Amen Remix)

Charts

Weekly charts

Year-end charts

Certifications

References

1996 singles
1996 songs
Bertelsmann Music Group singles
Music videos directed by Giacomo De Simone
Songs written by Ann Lee (singer)
Songs written by Larry Pignagnoli
Whigfield songs